Neochen pugil is an extinct species of goose from the Late Pleistocene or possibly the Early Holocene of Brazil. The fossils were discovered by Danish paleontologist Peter Wilhelm Lund near Lagoa Santa, Minas Gerais state, and described by Danish ornithologist Oluf Winge in 1888. It was related to the living Orinoco goose, but much larger.

References

External links 
 
 

Tadorninae
Pleistocene birds
Quaternary birds of South America
Pleistocene Brazil
Fossils of Brazil
Fossil taxa described in 1888